Divorce American Style is a 1967 American film, directed by Bud Yorkin and starring Dick Van Dyke, Debbie Reynolds, Jason Robards, Jean Simmons, and Van Johnson. Norman Lear produced the comedy satire and wrote the script, based on a story by Robert Kaufman. It focuses on a married couple who opt for divorce when counseling fails to help them resolve their various problems, and the problems presented to divorced people by alimony. The title is an homage to Divorce Italian Style (1961).

Plot
After 17 years of marriage, affluent Los Angeles suburban couple Richard Harmon (Van Dyke) and his wife Barbara (Reynolds) seem to have it all, but they are constantly bickering. When they discover they can no longer communicate properly, they make an effort to salvage their relationship through counseling, but after catching each other emptying their joint bank accounts (at the urging of friends), they file for divorce.

Richard finds himself living in a small apartment and trying to survive on $87.30 a week after his take-home income has been cut dramatically by high alimony. Richard meets a recently divorced man, Nelson Downes (Robards), who introduces him to ex-wife Nancy (Simmons). Nelson wants to marry off Nancy to be free of his alimony burden, so  he can marry his pregnant fiancée. Nancy also wishes to marry because she is lonely. To end Richard's alimony woes, Nelson and Nancy plot to set up Barbara with a millionaire auto dealer, Big Al Yearling (Johnson), and the two begin a relationship.

On the night before the Harmon divorce becomes final, all three couples meet to celebrate the success of their plans. At a nightclub, a hypnotist pulls Barbara from the audience and puts her into a trance. After inducing her into performing a mock striptease, she instructs Barbara to kiss her true love. Barbara plants one on Richard, and they realize they love each other too much to go through with the divorce. An undeterred Nelson immediately tries to get Nancy interested in Big Al.

Cast
 Dick Van Dyke as Richard Harmon 
 Debbie Reynolds as Barbara Harmon
 Jason Robards as Nelson Downes 
 Jean Simmons as Nancy Downes 
 Van Johnson as Al Yearling 
 Joe Flynn as Lionel Blandsforth 
 Shelley Berman as David Grieff 
 Martin Gabel as Dr. Zenwinn 
 Lee Grant as Dede Murphy 
 Pat Collins as Pat Collins, the "Hip Hypnotist" 
 Tom Bosley as Farley 
 Emmaline Henry as Fern Blandsforth 
 Dick Gautier as Larry Strickland 
 Tim Matheson as Mark Harmon (as Tim Matthieson)
 Gary Goetzman as Jonathan Harmon
 Eileen Brennan as Eunice Tase 
 Shelley Morrison as Jackie
 Bella Bruck as Celia 
 John J. Anthony as Judge

Reception
The film earned an estimated $5,150,000 in North American rentals in 1967.

Critical reception
In his review in the Chicago Sun-Times, Roger Ebert called the film "a member of that rare species, the Hollywood comedy with teeth in it" and added, "Bud Yorkin has directed with wit and style, and the cast, which seems unlikely on paper, comes across splendidly on the screen . . . The charm of this film is in its low-key approach. The plot isn't milked for humor or pathos: Both emerge naturally from familiar situations."

Variety observed, "Comedy and satire, not feverish melodrama, are the best weapons with which to harpoon social mores. An outstanding example is Divorce American Style . . . which pokes incisive, sometimes chilling, fun at US marriage-divorce problems."

The New York Times film critic Bosley Crowther disliked the film, saying, "it is rather depressing, saddening, and annoying, largely because it does labor to turn a solemn subject into a great big American-boob joke." Crowther criticized Van Dyke's performance, remarking, "He is too much of a giggler, too much of a dyed-in-the-wool television comedian for this serio-comic husband role."

A 2012 review in Time Out cited "Two or three very funny scenes . . . and a first-rate batch of supporting performances."

Awards and honors
Norman Lear and Robert Kaufman were nominated for the Academy Award for Best Original Screenplay, but lost to William Rose for Guess Who's Coming to Dinner. Lear also was nominated for the Writers Guild of America Award for Best Written American Comedy.

Novelization
About two months prior to the release of the film—as was customary of the era—a paperback novelization of the screenplay was published; in this case by Popular Library, commissioning editor Patrick O'Connor. The author was Jackson (in later years aka Jack) Donahue. Donahue started his career as a police reporter and went on to become managing editor of several major newspapers. He had already written a number of well-regarded novels (among them The Confessor and Erase My Name) by the time he took on the adaptation of Divorce American Style. He would also write several works of non-fiction, including co-authorship of Leon Jaworski's Watergate memoir, The Right and the Power.

See also
List of American films of 1967

References

External links
 
 
 

1967 films
1967 comedy films
American comedy films
American satirical films
Columbia Pictures films
Films scored by Dave Grusin
Films about divorce
Films set in Los Angeles
Films directed by Bud Yorkin
Films with screenplays by Norman Lear
1960s English-language films
Films produced by Norman Lear
1960s American films